St. Paul's School, also known as St. Paul's Chapel School, is a historic Rosenwald school building for African Americans located at Meredithville, Brunswick County, Virginia. It was built in 1920, and is a one-room school measuring approximately 20 feet by 40 feet.  It is of wood-frame construction, sheathed in un-beaded weatherboards, and covered by a standing seam metal roof.

It was listed on the National Register of Historic Places in 2004.

References

Rosenwald schools in Virginia
One-room schoolhouses in Virginia
School buildings on the National Register of Historic Places in Virginia
Buildings and structures in Brunswick County, Virginia
School buildings completed in 1920
National Register of Historic Places in Brunswick County, Virginia
Historic districts on the National Register of Historic Places in Virginia